The Last Dog and Pony Show is the fourth solo album by American alternative rock musician Bob Mould.

Background
The title refers to the fact that Mould planned to cease touring with a full electric band after supporting the album (a plan he stuck to until hitting the road to support his 2005 release, Body of Song). "I'm 37 years old now," he said at the time. "I've been doing it for almost 20 years. As I get older, I don't enjoy four months on the road of full-throttle volume all the time. Though I still like that kind of music, I'd rather get away from it while I still enjoy it, as opposed to doing it because it's my calling card and it's worked."

"Every other record I do is a bright or a dark record," he observed. "It's not intentional. Maybe it's just me struggling to find some kind of balance. I think this one's fairly outgoing compared to my last, especially, which was real dark and claustrophobic because that was the way I was feeling at the time. This one is a little more easygoing. The stories are a little simpler and more universal. I tend to go through phases when I'm writing, and this one went through three or four pretty distinct stylistic phases before arriving at the bulk of the record, which is the upbeat electric stuff."

Having used programmed drums on his previous, self-titled album, on which he was the sole performer, Mould this time returned to using a real drummer, Matt Hammon. Cellist Alison Chesley also contributes to two tracks.

While the album is steeped in the driving rock he had become known for, songs like "Reflecting Pool," the mechanical-sounding "First Drag of the Day" and the sample-heavy "Megamanic" demonstrate the growing interest in electronica which he would spend the next few years exploring in more depth.

Reception

The track "Who Was Around?" was named Best Rock/Alternative Song at the 1998 Gay & Lesbian American Music Awards.

Track listing
All tracks composed by Bob Mould

 "New #1" — 4:47
 "Moving Trucks" — 3:30
 "Taking Everything" — 3:26
 "First Drag of the Day" — 4:29
 "Classifieds" — 3:04
 "Who Was Around?" — 4:08
 "Skintrade" — 5:43
 "Vaporub" — 4:05
 "Sweet Serene" — 3:25
 "Megamanic" — 3:39
 "Reflecting Pool" — 3:39
 "Along the Way" — 4:18
Some copies of the album include a bonus disc featuring a lengthy interview with Mould conducted by Jack Rabid.

Personnel
Bob Mould - vocals, guitar, bass, keyboards, programming, sampling
Matt Hammon - drums
Alison Chesley - cello (1 and 12)
Jim Wilson - engineer, sampling
Howie Weinberg - mastering

Charts

References

Bob Mould albums
1998 albums
Albums produced by Bob Mould
Rykodisc albums